Westport is a neighborhood in south Baltimore, Maryland. Westport is a majority African-American neighborhood that has struggled with crime, housing abandonment, and unemployment in the past decade. The neighborhood is bordered by the Middle Branch of the Patapsco River on the east, the city neighborhoods of Cherry Hill, Brooklyn and the southwestern Baltimore County community of Lansdowne to the southwest, Hollins Ferry Road and the Mount Winans and Lakeland neighborhoods to the west, and Interstate 95 to the north, along with the South Baltimore communities of Federal Hill and Otterbein.  The Baltimore–Washington Parkway (Maryland Route 295 — formerly Interstate 295) runs through the middle of Westport and intersects with Interstate 95, the main East Coast super-highway, north to south, Maine to Florida.

History
The neighborhood is mostly brick row homes built in the 1920s with small front porches of the "Daylight" style.  The neighborhood consisted of mostly blue-collar workers who worked at nearby businesses which faced the waterfront of the Middle Branch (formerly known as "Ferry Branch" of the Patapsco River in the 19th century and in the colonial era as "Ridgley's Cove" and adjacent Smith's Cove) of the modern Baltimore Harbor and Port and Patapsco River such as the Carr Lowrey Glass Company and the Constellation Energy's Baltimore Gas and Electric Company's Westport Generating Plant.  A railroad bridge trestle for the old Western Maryland Railway and the Baltimore and Ohio Railroad leading east to their Locust Point facilities for the B. & O. and to Port Covington for the W.M.Ry. terminals in South Baltimore crossed the Middle Branch and runs east and west through the Westport community.  Over the years, the industrial core of Baltimore faded and many residents moved to the suburbs, leaving neighborhoods like Westport and nearby Mount Winans, Lakeland and southwest Baltimore to fall into disrepair. Despite a concrete re-paving of the main commercial street of Old Annapolis Road and a planting of rows of new shade trees and new sidewalks & curbing in the early 1970s, by the later decade, numerous businesses, branch banks and other stores and shops closed along the commercial/residential strip, including a branch library of the Enoch Pratt Free Library at Old Annapolis and Waterview Avenue.  According to an article from the Baltimore Department of Planning, by 2000, 22% of the homes in Westport were abandoned.

When the long-time industrial leader in its field, the Carr Lowrey Glass Company closed and went out of business, the  property was purchased by Inner Harbor West LLC for $6.82 million.  The prior year, Inner Harbor West LLC had also purchased the  old Baltimore Gas & Electric Company's 1920s era power plant from its holding company, Constellation Energy Group.  The Carr Lowrey factory was leveled 
along with demolition of the 
substantial huge obsolete heavy-polluting coal-fired power plant and there were plans for waterfront development with a waterfront park and promenade access, though now stalled by 2019.

Westport has a picturesque view to the east of the concrete arched spans of the 1914–1917 historic  Hanover Street Bridge and the Baltimore downtown skyline along the Inner Harbor to the northeast.  As a result of the potential development and newly recognized new waterfront viability with access reopened, housing prices among the 1910s and 20s era rows of older rowhouses on the few Westport streets rose significantly in anticipation of the neighborhood becoming "the Next Canton".

Four decades earlier in 1985, the Wheelabrator Incinerator, a waste-to-energy plant, was built further north of the neighborhood along the mouth/outlet of the Gwynns Falls stream on the northwestern shore of the Middle Branch of the Patapsco River harbor in Westport, near Interstate 95. The tall white smokestack that reads "Baltimore"  in capital letters, is considered a distinctive landmark for motorists traveling on I-95. Here is the ending of the Gwynns Falls Trail, a hiking/biking path following the stream on its course through southwest, them west, then to northwestern city neighborhoods to Baltimore County beyond with interpretative signage along the path of its historical sites and environmental importance along the way in the picturesque stream valley and parks.

In the spring of 2011, City officials gave the green light to major city developer, Patrick Turner for future development along its Middle Branch waterfront over the next ten years in phases.  Westport was designated a "BRAC Zone" to attract major employers with many incentives, especially attracting contractors from both military installations at Aberdeen Proving Grounds in Harford County, Maryland and Fort George G. Meade in northern Anne Arundel County  (Baltimore Development Corporation).   The first phase of development is expected to begin in late 2011 and during 2012, with a luxury apartment building being the first of many buildings.  The rezoning bill for Westport's main drag on Annapolis Road went into effect on May 11, 2011, together with the Annapolis Road Urban Renewal Plan (URP), with hopes to add businesses in its existing neighborhood as the waterfront develops. Patrick Turner himself, the City and its now very active and rejuvenated Westport Neighborhood Association had a lot to do with the hopeful neighborhood improvements.

Up until the recession that eventually landed Turner in US bankruptcy court, Patrick was committed to improving the urban landscape in Westport and its surrounding neighborhoods, Cherry Hill, Mt. Winans and Lakeland. But due to the aforementioned bankruptcy, those dreams were squashed, leaving the 43-acre parcel of land undeveloped. There were a number of community leaders involved in Patrick Turner's Westport Waterfront Development Project, including Ben Stone (Formerly of the Baltimore Development Corporation), Michael Middleton (Executive Director of Cherry Hill Development Corporation), Janette Wheeler, RN (President & CEO of Mt. Winans Community Development Corporation), Ruth Sherill (Former President of Westport Neighborhood Association), Linda Towe (Executive Director of Project T.O.O.U.R.), Gregory L. Countess, Esq. (Legal Adviser), Kim Trueheart (Cherry Hill Development Corporation-Youth Partner). There was no representative for the Lakeland neighborhood. Collectively the group also worked on vapor intrusion stemming from a former industrial site, located next to a number of homes, demanding the state address the hazardous toxic vapors in Westport.

Since then, the Westport Community Economic Development Corporation (CEDC) has worked with the Westport Neighborhood Association and multiple non-profit organizations to coordinate other neighborhood programs, including voicing local concerns regarding the waterfront redevelopment. In July 2018, the South Baltimore 7 Organizational Assessment and Strategic Planning Report was published, summarizing organizational assessments, community goals, and other strategic findings. Stemming from this report, in December 2018, the organizations publicly announced an memorandum of understanding under the collective banner campaign of the Harbor West Collaborative; under the non-profit umbrella of the Westport CEDC. The Collaborative meets quarterly as the Westport CEDC works to better leverage master planning efforts, organize community needs, and better disseminate neighborhood information.  In 2019, the Westport Annapolis Road Corridor for Department of Transportation was published, announcing plans for infrastructural investments in line with pending development of the waterfront parcels, with goals including safer pedestrian streets, accommodating truck movements, promoting residential and commercial re-investment, and enhanced sustainability.

In early 2020, a master planning effort began with a live catalog  collection of all previous plans and reports and a live press room being published on the Harbor West Collaborative (CEDC) website in June 2020. In December 2020, Stonewall Capital presented its preliminary plan for the Waterfront redevelopment to the City UDAAP committee. In December 2020, master planning charrettes began for neighboring 'target opportunity' projects, including on November 28, 2020, a Regional Community Center Charrette; and on January 16, 2021, a Waterfront Development charrette. Future charrettes will be announced by the Harbor West Collaborative.

Demographics
As of the census of 2000, there were 2,185 people living in the neighborhood. The racial makeup of Westport was 9.8% White, 88.8% African American, 0.2% Native American, 0.5% Asian, 0.2% from other races, and 0.7% from two or more races. Hispanic or Latino of any race were 0.9% of the population. 32.4% of occupied housing units were owner-occupied. 22.0% of housing units were vacant.

The demographics of this neighborhood is expected to have a dramatic change with pending waterfront development within the next few years.

34.6% of the population were employed, 17.9% were unemployed, and 47.5% were not in the labor force. The median household income was $16,250. About 45.7% of families and 43.0% of the population were below the poverty line.

Sports
This neighborhood was the site of the old Westport Raceway - a stock car dirt track racing course during the 1930s - 1940s to mid 1950s along with adjacent Westport Stadium, a baseball grounds used by various Negro leagues professional baseball teams, the Baltimore Black Sox in the 1920s and early 1930s, followed by the later Baltimore Elite Giants in the 1940s. Located near Old Annapolis Road (Maryland Route 648) and Waterview Avenue, until the routing and construction in the early 1950s which split the community of Westport for the Baltimore-Washington Parkway, (Interstate 295), going north into downtown from the southwest via Russell Street completed in 1954.

Westport was also the "home town" neighborhood  of Al Kaline, who played Maryland Scholastic Association (M.S.A.) high school competition in baseball and attending, later graduated from South Baltimore's Southern High School (now Digital Harbor High School two blocks further away to the southeast), near Federal Hill in old South Baltimore in June 1953 and was quickly scouted and recruited by the Detroit Tigers of the American League for the then-all-time high amount of signing bonus of $35,000.00. He began his major league career immediately that same month after graduating from S.H.S. without spending any time in the lower minor leagues. Al Kaline also had earlier attracted attention as he coached the Westport Methodist Baseball League.

At that time, after two years of negotiations, local Baltimore businessmen led by attorney Clarence Miles with Baltimore City Mayor Thomas D'Alesandro, Jr., made a deal with the American League team owners and had just purchased its St. Louis Browns franchise from controversial owner Bill Veeck in November 1953, and to move the team to Maryland becoming the renamed new Baltimore Orioles who played their first game in the city, in April 1954, coincidentally the following season after Baltimorean school sports star Kaline began play with the Tigers on Lake Michigan.

Transportation
Westport is served by Baltimore's north to south (Hunt Valley to BWI Airport and Glen Burnie) Light Rail system with the Westport Station.  The Westport stop is just south of the Hamburg Street stop, which serves M&T Bank Stadium for the NFL professional football team of the Baltimore Ravens and adjacent Oriole Park at Camden Yards ballpark for the major league Baltimore Orioles baseball team in the Camden Yards sports complex, and is just further north of the Cherry Hill neighborhood stop further to the south off Cherry Hill Road and Waterview Avenue.  The [Maryland Transit Administration]'s bus lines also run along the Baltimore-Annapolis Boulevard (or aka Old Annapolis Road) (Maryland Route 648).

References

External links
Westport Neighborhood Association
 Westport Community Economic Development Corporation
BRAC Incentives
Westport Waterfront
BizJournal Development Article
Map of Westport, Baltimore

 
African-American history in Baltimore
Neighborhoods in Baltimore
Maryland populated places on the Chesapeake Bay
Poverty in Maryland
Working-class culture in Baltimore